Odites microbolista is a moth in the family Depressariidae. It was described by Edward Meyrick in 1937. It is found in Uganda.

The larvae feed on Coffea species, rolling the leaves of their host plant.

References

Moths described in 1937
Odites
Taxa named by Edward Meyrick